Escape Room is a 2018 American horror film directed by Peter Dukes and starring Skeet Ulrich.

Plot

Cast
Skeet Ulrich as Brice
Sean Young as Ramona
Christine Donlon as Jess
Randy Wayne as Jeff
Matt McVay as Ben
Ashley Gallegos as Angie
Hayley Goldstein as Molly
Iyad Hajjaj as Ammon
Ibrahim Elkest as Mohamed
Taylor Piedmonte as Stitchface
Hayley Mclaughin as Hannah

Production
Filming wrapped in May 2016.

Release
The film was released via Redbox on May 8, 2018.

References

External links
 
 

2010s English-language films
2018 films
2018 horror films
American horror films
Films about death games
2010s American films
English-language horror films